Imed Memmich (Arabic: عماد مميش ; born 8 September 1966) is a Tunisian scholar and politician serving as Minister of Defence since 2021.

References 

1966 births
Living people
21st-century Tunisian politicians
Carthage University
Defence ministers of Tunisia
Tunisian Muslims
Tunisian scholars